Peter Macann is a former British actor, reporter, and television presenter who is most notable for co-hosting the BBC science show Tomorrow's World in the late 1980s and early 1990s.

Since retiring from the BBC, he has worked as a consultant for various companies on managing culture change within their organizations. He currently lives in Buckinghamshire.

Filmography

References

External links

Living people
British television presenters
Year of birth missing (living people)